"Tus Besos" ("Your Kisses") is a song by Dominican singer-songwriter Juan Luis Guerra, it was released by Capitol Latin on August 25, 2014. Is the lead single from his twelfth studio album Todo Tiene Su Hora (2014). The music video was nominated for Video of the Year at the Lo Nuestro Awards of 2015.

Track listing 
Digital download
 "Tus Besos" -

Charts

Year-end charts

See also
List of Billboard number-one Latin songs of 2014

References 

2014 singles
Juan Luis Guerra songs
Spanish-language songs
Songs written by Juan Luis Guerra
2014 songs
Capitol Latin singles
Latin Grammy Award for Best Tropical Song